Lover Come Back is a 1931 Columbia Pictures pre-Code drama directed by Erle C. Kenton from a script by Dorothy Howell. The story was based on a McCall's magazine feature by Helen Topping Miller.

Plot 
After the man she hoped to marry is lured away by a sultry vamp, a dejected stenographer gives in to her boss's advances and moves into his New York City apartment. Of course, soon the sultry vamp is after her boss. Complications abound.

Cast 

 Constance Cummings as Connie Lee
 Jack Mulhall as Tom Evans
 Betty Bronson as Vivian March
 Jameson Thomas as Yates

References 

1931 films
Columbia Pictures films
American black-and-white films
American drama films
1931 drama films
Films directed by Erle C. Kenton
1930s American films
1930s English-language films